Tyler Sikura (born May 18, 1992) is a Canadian professional ice hockey centre currently playing with the Wilkes-Barre/Scranton Penguins in the American Hockey League (AHL).

Playing career
Tyler Sikura played midget hockey in the Markham Waxers system, then played two years of Junior A hockey with the Newmarket Hurricanes. Sikura played four years for the Dartmouth Big Green, where he was named a first team Ivy League All Star in 2013. He captained the Big Green for his final two seasons. Following his collegiate career, he played a pair of games for the Springfield Falcons of the American Hockey League (AHL). 

He spent most of the next two years with the Toledo Walleye of the ECHL before being traded to the Manchester Monarchs. In 2017, Sikura landed a spot on the Rockford IceHogs, the AHL affiliate of the Chicago Blackhawks. He scored over 20 goals and earned a contract from the Blackhawks for the following season. As well, he tied a franchise record for most consecutive games with goals scored with five. At the conclusion of the 2017–18 season, Sikura was named the teams Most Valuable Player.

On July 1, 2019, Sikura continued his tenure with the Rockford IceHogs, returning on a one-year AHL contract. He was subsequently named an alternate captain alongside Jacob Nilsson and Matthew Highmore. In the 2019–20 season, Sikura posted 14 goals and 20 assists for 34 points in 63 appearances with the IceHogs before the season was cancelled due to the COVID-19 pandemic.

As a free agent, Sikura left the IceHogs to sign a one-year contract to continue in the AHL with the Cleveland Monsters on October 14, 2020. In the pandemic shortened 2020–21 season, Sikura increased his offensive output, registering 21 points in just 29 regular season games. On July 28, 2021, he was signed by the Monsters' NHL affiliate, the Columbus Blue Jackets to a one-year, two-way contract.

After two seasons within the Blue Jackets organization, Sikura left as a free agent and continued his career in the AHL, agreeing to a one-year contract with the Wilkes-Barre/Scranton Penguins, affiliate to the Pittsburgh Penguins, on October 3, 2022.

Personal life
Sikura's brother Dylan was drafted by the Chicago Blackhawks in 2014 and is currently playing within the organization. Sikura is half Slovakian. His grandfather escaped Czechoslovakia and arrived in Nova Scotia in the 1950s. He ran a thoroughbred race horse breeding farm, Hill 'n' Dale Farms, until his death, in which it was taken over by Sikura's uncle and father.

Career statistics

Awards and honours

References

External links
 

1992 births
Living people
Ice hockey people from Ontario
Sportspeople from Aurora, Ontario
Canadian ice hockey centres
Cleveland Monsters players
Dartmouth Big Green men's ice hockey players
Iowa Wild players
Manchester Monarchs (ECHL) players
Portland Pirates players
Rockford IceHogs (AHL) players
Springfield Falcons players
Toledo Walleye players
Wilkes-Barre/Scranton Penguins players